The Fiat 241 is a van produced by Fiat between 1965 and 1974. It has a payload over 1400 kg and was available in various formats like truck, van and bare chassis.

The Fiat 241 was offered in parallel to the Fiat 238.  The 241 is a rear wheel drive as the 238 was front wheel drive.  The engine in the 241 was centrally located in the cab and not like the 238 under the passenger bench. Thus, it was only two seater.  It had two engine options: petrol (1481 cc OHV, derived from 1500C ) and diesel (1895 cc, the same as Campagnola). It was

It was replaced by the Fiat 242. 

241
Vans